Rivales (Rivals), may refer to:

Film
Rivales (film), a 2008 Spanish film directed by Fernando Colomo.

Music
"Rivales", a 2017 song by Mexican artists Gloria Trevi and Alejandra Guzmán.